Live in Houston is the first live album published by comedian Louis C.K. In contrast to later releases, it was produced and published independently, and sold primarily at shows and directly through the comedian's website. The album later became the subject of interest when controversy arose surrounding whether similar material on the 2005 Dane Cook album Retaliation was plagiarized from the Louis C.K. material. Much of the material overlaps with C.K.'s Comedy Central Presents special, recorded the same year.

C.K. re-released the audio-only album as a CD, vinyl album, and audio download on his website in April 2020.

Track listing

References

2001 live albums
2000s comedy albums
2000s in comedy
Louis C.K. albums
Self-released albums